Werner Zandt (20 October 1927 – 13 October 2009) was a German sprinter. He competed in the men's 100 metres at the 1952 Summer Olympics.

Competition record

References

1927 births
2009 deaths
Athletes (track and field) at the 1952 Summer Olympics
German male sprinters
Olympic athletes of Germany
Sportspeople from Stuttgart